The Civic Unity Party (CUP) is an Azerbaijani political party established in 1999 in Moscow by the former President of Azerbaijan Ayaz Mutallibov. After the 2000 parliamentary elections in Azerbaijan, the party split between into two fractions: one led by Ayaz Mutallibov and the other led by Igbal Agazade. The latter fraction formed the Party of Hope.

In 2003, Mutallibov split from CUP, joining the Social Democratic Party of Azerbaijan as its chairman. From then on, CUP was led by Sabir Hajiyev and participated in 2005 parliamentary elections, gaining 1 out 125 seats in the National Assembly of Azerbaijan. Albeit nominally an opposition party, CUP officially supports the incumbent President Ilham Aliyev.

References

1999 establishments in Azerbaijan
Political parties established in 1999
Political parties in Azerbaijan